Antigua and Barbuda competed in the 1978 Commonwealth Games in Edmonton, Alberta, Canada from August 3 to August 12, 1978. Their team consisted of five male athletes competing in track and field events.

Athletics

Men

Track & road events

Field events

References

Nations at the 1978 Commonwealth Games
Antigua and Barbuda at the Commonwealth Games
1978 in Antigua and Barbuda